Events from the year 1665 in Denmark.

Incumbents 

 Monarch - Frederick III

Events 
14 November – The King's Law or Lex Regia (Danish and Norwegian: Kongeloven) was introduced.

Undated

Births 
 14 May – Hans Seidelin, civil servant and landowner (died 1740)

Full date unknown

Deaths

Full date unknown

References 

 
Denmark
Years of the 17th century in Denmark